Richard Dean McCarthy (September 24, 1927 – May 5, 1995) was an American newspaperman and politician who served three terms as a Democratic member of the United States House of Representatives from New York from 1965 to 1971.

He was also known as Richard Max McCarthy or Max McCarthy.

Life
He served in the United States Navy from November 1945 until August 1946, and in the United States Army from November 1950 until October 1952.

He graduated from Canisius College in 1950. He worked for the Buffalo News from 1952 until 1956.

Congress 
He was elected to Congress in 1964 and served from January 3, 1965 to January 3, 1971. In 1970, he ran in the Democratic primary for the nomination for U.S. Senator from New York against Ted Sorensen, Richard Ottinger and Paul O'Dwyer, but was defeated by Ottinger.

Later career 
He worked as a press attaché to the American Embassy in Tehran from 1975 to 1976. He was the Washington bureau chief of the Buffalo News from 1978 until his retirement in 1989.

Sources

1927 births
1995 deaths
Politicians from Buffalo, New York
Burials at Arlington National Cemetery
Canisius College alumni
Democratic Party members of the United States House of Representatives from New York (state)
20th-century American politicians
American expatriates in Iran